High Spirits may refer to:

 High Spirits (musical), a Broadway production based on the Noël Coward play Blithe Spirit
 High Spirits (album), a 1964 album by Jamaican saxophonist Joe Harriott containing selections from the musical
 High Spirits (film), a comedy starring Peter O'Toole
 High Spirits (short story collection), a book by Robertson Davies
 High Spirits with Shirley Ghostman, a British television comedy show
 The High Spirits, an American garage rock band